KYMN (1080 AM) is a radio station broadcasting a news/talk and adult album alternative format. Licensed to Northfield, Minnesota, United States, the station primarily serves the cities of Northfield and Dundas in the southern portion of the Minneapolis-St. Paul area.  The station is currently locally owned by Northfield Media, Inc., owned by Jeff Johnson, long time morning show host of KYMN. KYMN's music and entertainment programs are all made locally with state news provided by the Minnesota News Network.

History 
KYMN has served the Northfield community at 1080 AM since 1968. Founder Stan Stydnicki launched the station to provide an eclectic mix of programs, including community news, sports and music.

In March 1983, KYMN became the first station in Minnesota and first daytimer in the world to adopt AM stereo. Beginning with the Harris System and later switching to the C-QUAM system. KYMN has since discontinued broadcasting in AM stereo.

A new FM signal, K236CD, launched in 2016, sending the station's signal to the surrounding communities of Cannon Falls, Nerstrand, Faribault and Lonsdale.

KYMN has won the best of radio station in Southern Minnesota award, 5 times. Several hosts at KYMN have also won the best radio host in Southern Minnesota. Both awards are given by the Southern Minnesota Scene Magazine.

Today 
Today KYMN's programs are all locally made with a combination of news/talk programs and music based shows. KYMN also broadcasts several local high school games in both audio and video format. 

KYMN's music library consists of over 3,000 songs spanning most of the music genres including pop, rock, blues, jazz, oldies, Americana, and country. KYMN also has a large collection of Minnesota based artists music.

References

External links
Official website
 KYMN Climate Show
KYMN featured on KARE-TV in 1987. Retrieved June 5, 2017.

Radio stations in Minnesota
Radio stations established in 1968
1968 establishments in Minnesota